Midway is an incorporated town in Davidson County, North Carolina, United States. It is located within the township of the same name. Midway is part of the Piedmont Triad region and is neighbored by the communities of Arcadia (west), Welcome (south), Wallburg (northeast) and Winston-Salem (north). Every autumn, the town hosts the Midway Christmas Parade in celebration of the coming Christmas season.

History
Bethany Reformed and Lutheran Church Cemetery and the Hamilton Everhart Farm are listed on the National Register of Historic Places.

Demographics

2020 census

As of the 2020 United States census, there were 4,742 people, 1,948 households, and 1,386 families residing in the town.

Etymology
The town of Midway derives its name from its relative geographic location, "midway" between the cities of Winston-Salem and Lexington. Originally, the community which now forms the center of modern Midway was founded as "Eller" when the Eller train depot was constructed, labeled as such after members of the Eller family which resided nearby. Until incorporation in 2006, many maps still marked the area as "Eller", despite disuse of the name over time by the public, local media, and local establishments.

Post office
The town of Midway does not currently have a post office, or a ZIP code to its name. As a result, most residents of the town either use Winston-Salem or Lexington city names for mailing via the United States Postal Service.

Incorporation
The community sought incorporation from 2004–2006 to protect local identity and to prevent annexation by nearby Winston-Salem. The successful incorporation of nearby Wallburg inspired the formation of the Midway Incorporation Committee, which led the effort to make Midway a town. A petition drive in 2005 gathered the required signatures of 51 percent of the voting population within the proposed town limits. In April 2005, the city of Winston-Salem granted the incorporation committee the approval to seek incorporation with a few minor changes to the proposed town limits, a necessary step required by the Constitution of North Carolina. An act of incorporation was then submitted to the North Carolina General Assembly for approval (Senate Bill S1852), which was unanimously ratified on June 29, 2006. Midway is Davidson County's fifth and newest incorporated municipality. Norman Wilkes was the town's first (interim) mayor, and held the title until official elections in 2007, when George Byrum became the town's first elected mayor.

Education
Midway is home to Midway Elementary School, a K-5 grade school, which is part of the Davidson County School System. The school feeds mostly into Oak Grove Middle and High schools which are new and just down the road.  According to attendance area maps, a few students will attend North Davidson Middle (grades 6–8) and North Davidson High (grades 9-12), both located in neighboring Welcome.

Notable people
 Wilmer David "Vinegar Bend" Mizell, Major League Baseball pitcher and U.S. congressman
9th Wonder, record producer
Shy Tuttle, defensive tackle for the New Orleans Saints
Terry Labonte, Hall of Fame NASCAR driver

References

External links
 Town of Midway official website
 Midway Fire & Rescue
 Midway Elementary School
 Midway Town Charter
 The Dispatch - Midway incorporation effort clears final committee hurdle
 The Dispatch - Midway is finally a town
 The Dispatch - New era begins in Midway

Towns in Davidson County, North Carolina
Towns in North Carolina
Geography of Winston-Salem, North Carolina